Healthy Land and Water Limited (formerly Healthy Waterways) is an Australian not-for-profit organisation using evidence-based research and monitoring of South East Queensland waterways to determine catchment health. Queensland Government’s Department of Environment and Science, local councils, water utilities and industry co-fund the organisation to deliver scientific information about the region’s rivers and catchments with the stated aim of guiding on-ground rehabilitation efforts.

The organisation's activities include:
 coordinating scientific research to advice South East Queensland's stakeholders, including local and State government
 creating tools to identify cost-effective management actions to address waterway issues 
 monitoring and reporting on the condition of South East Queensland's waterways
 providing capacity-building for water management professionals and communities
 developing education programs to improve community attitudes towards water, biodiversity and sustainability.

Tourism 

Tourism centred around South East Queensland waterways generates $6 billion each year. About $2–3 billion is generated through recreation.  The South East Queensland region is made up of 14 major river catchments and covers an area of around 23,000 km2. stretching from Noosa in the north to the Gold Coast in the south and west to the Great Dividing Range.

History 
In 2005, The South East Queensland Council of Mayors created the SEQ Catchments Members Association to collaborate and involve the community in managing natural resources, resulting in the organisation then known as SEQ Catchments whose role was to secure funding from government and business for projects to improve grazing, reduce erosion, repair waterways, manage pests and weeds, restore degraded habitats and look after coastal areas.

In 2008 the International Water Centre was the managing agent for Southeast Queensland Healthy Waterways working with the Healthy Waterways Board providing of IT, financial, legal, human resource and office support services and the sharing of knowledge and management tools with other river basin managers in the world.

Healthy Land and Water developed the South East Queensland Natural Resource Management Plan 2009-2031.

Healthy Waterways' income was halved in 2015, falling to $488,659. SEQ Catchments experienced an $835,142 loss over the same period. Healthy Waterways merged with SEQ Catchments in 2016 to form Healthy Land & Water.

In 2016 the report found about 15,000 dump trucks' worth of sediment enters south-east Queensland's waterways every year, with sediment pollution the number one pressure on catchments.

Monitoring ecosystem health 
The main product of the organisation is an annual report card which measures the health of individual catchments from year to year. The report measures how much mud and rubbish (sediment and pollution) is entering waterways. This has highlighted the need to reduce sediment runoff in South East Queensland's rural and urban areas. The Ecosystem Health Report Card is released in October each year. The report analyses data from 135 freshwater and 254 estuarine and marine sites across south-east Queensland. Grades ranging from 'A for excellent' to 'F for fail' are assigned to 19 catchments and 18 estuaries, as well as nine zones within Moreton Bay.

Approaches taken by South-East Queensland stakeholders to ensure healthier waterways and increased investment in water infrastructure have involved researchers from across University of Queensland  working together to guide Queensland’s water future through scientific discovery, technological innovation and policy development.

Awards 
Annual Healthy Land and Water (Healthy Waterways) Awards recognise achievements of groups and individuals including schools, community groups, students, government, industry, researchers, planners and designers, whose work contributes to achieving the Healthy Land and Water vision. The Grand Prize, worth $10,000, is awarded to the most innovative winner of the other award categories.

References

External links 
 SEQ Catchments http://www.seqcatchments.com.au/seq-nrm-plan-1/the-seq-nrm-plan
 Healthy Land & Water http://hlw.org.au
 Healthy Land & Water 2016 Annual and Sustainability Report http://hlw.org.au/u/lib/mob/20170215130536_c4486301bfe163971/final-hwc-annual-report_small.pdf
 Healthy Land & Water Linkedin https://www.linkedin.com/company-beta/527046/
 Healthy Land and Water Facebook https://www.facebook.com/HealthyLandandWater/

South East Queensland
Natural resource management
Hydrology and urban planning
Waterways
Land use
Sustainability and environmental management
Hydrology organizations